Verizon Communications v. Law Offices of Curtis V. Trinko, LLP, often shortened to Verizon v. Trinko, 540 U.S. 398 (2004), is a case decided by the Supreme Court of the United States in the field of Antitrust law. It held that the Telecommunications Act of 1996 had not modified the framework of the Sherman Act, preserving claims that satisfy established antitrust standards without creating new claims that go beyond those standards.  It also refused to extend the essential facilities doctrine beyond the facts of the Aspen Skiing Co. v. Aspen Highlands Skiing Corp. case.

See also
 Verizon Communications Inc. v. FCC I
 Verizon Communications Inc. v. FCC II
 List of United States Supreme Court cases, volume 540

External links
 

United States Supreme Court cases
United States Supreme Court cases of the Rehnquist Court
United States antitrust case law
United States communications regulation case law
2004 in United States case law
Verizon Communications litigation